Carmen de Carupa is a municipality and town of Colombia in the Ubaté Province, part of the department of Cundinamarca. The municipality, located in the Ubaté-Chiquinquirá Valley on the Altiplano Cundiboyacense borders San Cayetano in the west, Tausa and Sutatausa in the south, Ubaté and Susa in the east and Simijaca and Buenavista and Coper (Boyacá) in the north.

History
The area around Carmen de Carupa was before the arrival of the Spanish conquistadors inhabited by the Muisca. The cacique of Ubaté ruled over the territories of Carmen de Carupa. The western and northern neighbouring indigenous group of Carmen de Carupa was the Muzo.

Modern Carmen de Carupa was founded on July 20, 1808 by José Joaquín Urdaneta and Doña Ventura.

Economy
Main economical activity in Carmen de Carupa is agriculture, predominantly potatoes.

References

Municipalities of Cundinamarca Department
Populated places established in 1808
1808 establishments in the Spanish Empire
Muisca Confederation